Paige Michelle VanZant (née Sletten; married name Vanderford; born March 26, 1994), is an American mixed martial artist, bare knuckle boxer, professional wrestler, author, and model. VanZant was previously signed to the Ultimate Fighting Championship, where she competed in the flyweight division. Outside of martial arts, Van Zant has been involved in professional wrestling with All Elite Wrestling and in Bare knuckle boxing with Bare Knuckle Fighting Championship. Additionally, Van Zant has appeared in the television series Dancing with the Stars and Chopped while she is currently a creator/model on the website OnlyFans.

Early life
VanZant was born in Dundee, Oregon, and raised in Sherwood, Oregon, both near Portland. Her parents owned a dance studio, and she was brought up dancing ballet, jazz, and hip hop for over 13 years. As a teen, she appeared in a mop commercial for Bissell. She was considered a tomboy while growing up, and loved the outdoors; her hobbies included riding dirt bikes and fishing. In high school, she was regularly bullied by a group of girls. The bullying included mocking her surname Sletten, which students changed to "Slutton". She eventually changed her surname legally to VanZant because of the persistent bullying. She chose "VanZant" because it was one of her mother's students' last names and she liked the way it sounded. However, she has noted this experience as one of the reasons she likes being a martial artist and having the ability to defend herself.

Martial arts career

Early career

After VanZant moved with her family to Sparks, Nevada, she was looking for a dance studio when she came across UFC veteran Ken Shamrock's gym, where she began training in boxing and other martial arts. After winning an amateur fight at age 18, VanZant made her professional MMA debut on June 30, 2012, at UWF's Tournament of Warriors finale against Jordan Nicole Gaza in Corpus Christi, Texas, winning by split decision. On September 22, 2012, she faced Amber Stautzenberger at Premier Fight Series 2 and won via unanimous decision.

VanZant faced Tecia Torres at Invicta FC 4: Esparza vs. Hyatt. The event was held on January 5, 2013, at the Memorial Hall in Kansas City, Kansas. VanZant was dominated on the feet for much of the fight and lost to Torres via a unanimous decision.

Ultimate Fighting Championship (2013–2020)

Strawweight division
In December 2013, VanZant was announced as one of 11 women signed by the Ultimate Fighting Championship (UFC) for its newly created Strawweight division. It was also announced that she would compete as a cast member on The Ultimate Fighter, a television reality series, as part of a tournament to crown the inaugural strawweight champion. However, on March 31, 2014, VanZant was turned away from the reality series because she was only 20 years old, and the minimum age to compete on it is 21 due to the presence of alcohol in the house.

In August 2014, the UFC announced that VanZant would face Kailin Curran on October 4, 2014, in Halifax at UFC Fight Night: MacDonald vs. Saffiedine, but VanZant suffered a back injury and the bout was rescheduled for UFC Fight Night: Edgar vs. Swanson. VanZant marked her UFC debut by defeating Curran by TKO in the third round, in a fight that would win Fight of the Night honors.

After defeating Kailin Curran, VanZant enjoyed an increase in popularity. In February 2015, she was signed to a sponsorship deal with Reebok. This became a source of controversy due to her having only one UFC fight at the time. Some media outlets and fighters speculated that VanZant only received the deal due to her physical attractiveness. UFC president Dana White responded that she received the Reebok deal because of her "it" factor and personality.

VanZant faced Felice Herrig on April 18, 2015, in Newark, New Jersey, at UFC on Fox: Machida vs. Rockhold. Following a competitive first round, VanZant eventually overwhelmed Herrig with her grappling, winning by unanimous decision.

VanZant faced Alex Chambers on September 5, 2015, at UFC 191. After controlling most of the fight with aggressive strikes and grappling, she won via armbar submission in the third round.

VanZant signed a new contract with UFC on September 17, 2015. VanZant was expected headline UFC Fight Night 80 on December 10, 2015, against Joanne Calderwood. However, Calderwood was pulled from the fight in October and replaced by Rose Namajunas. VanZant lost the one-sided fight via submission in the fifth round.

Following her time on Dancing with the Stars, VanZant returned to the cage to face Bec Rawlings on August 27, 2016, at UFC on Fox: Maia vs. Condit. She won the fight via KO in the second round after landing a flying head kick and a flurry of follow-up punches. The win earned VanZant her first Performance of the Night bonus award.

In her next bout, VanZant faced Michelle Waterson on December 17, 2016, in the main event at UFC on Fox: VanZant vs. Waterson. She lost the fight via technical submission due to a rear-naked choke in the first round.

She ended her run in the strawweight division ranked No. 12.

Flyweight division
In August 2017, VanZant moved to the 125-pound flyweight division and was booked against Jessica Eye at UFC 216 on October 7. However, VanZant pulled out of the fight on September 25 citing a back injury, and further ailments such as a herniated disc, sinus infection, double ear infection, pink eye and ringworm.

VanZant's debut in the flyweight division eventually took place in 2018 as she faced Jessica Rose-Clark on January 14, 2018, at UFC Fight Night: Stephens vs. Choi. After breaking her arm in the second round when attempting a spinning backfist, she lost the fight via unanimous decision.

After a year hiatus from competition due to a broken arm, VanZant faced Rachael Ostovich on January 19, 2019, at UFC Fight Night: Cejudo vs. Dillashaw. She won the fight via armbar submission in the second round.

VanZant was briefly linked to a matchup with Poliana Botelho on April 13, 2019, at UFC 236. However, just days after the pairing was leaked, VanZant announced that she would not be competing on the card due to a fractured right arm. Botelho remained on the card to face Lauren Mueller.

Initially, VanZant was told that she wouldn't require surgery on her arm and was targeting a return to the octagon in July. However, in early June, she told ESPN that the bone in her arm had not healed and that she would have to undergo surgery. She is projected to be sidelined for around three months.

VanZant was scheduled to face Amanda Ribas on March 14, 2020, at UFC Fight Night 170. However, VanZant was forced to pull out of the fight due to fracturing her right arm again (third such time for VanZant). She stated the injury was small and only needed 6–8 weeks to heal. VanZant requested to reschedule the bout one month later but Ribas decided to remain at the event and Randa Markos stepped in as the replacement. The bout with Ribas was rescheduled and eventually took place on July 12, 2020, at UFC 251. VanZant lost the fight via a submission in round one.

Bare Knuckle Fighting Championship (2020–present)
In August 2020, VanZant signed a four-bout contract to fight exclusively in the Bare Knuckle Fighting Championship reportedly worth over $1 million.

VanZant made her debut for the promotion on February 5, 2021, against Britain Hart in the main event of BKFC: Knucklemania in Tampa, Florida. She lost the fight via unanimous decision.

VanZant faced Rachael Ostovich – whom she defeated in mixed martial arts at UFC Fight Night: Cejudo vs. Dillashaw – at BKFC 19 on July 23, 2021. She lost the bout via unanimous decision. Following the loss, VanZant indicated her interest to resume MMA competition, speaking of her openness to join Bellator MMA.

VanZant was scheduled to face Charisa Sigala at BKFC 27 on August 20, 2022. However the fight was postponed to October 15, but was ultimately cancelled a week before the event.

Fighting style
VanZant typically attacks with aggressive grappling, then seeks to finish the fight with strikes. Her style includes ground-and-pound, dirty boxing, and a wide variety of clinch striking. While standing, she will often move the fight toward the fence and utilize knees, elbows, forearms, punches, and throws.

VanZant is noted for the constant pressure she applies while grappling. If an opponent escapes her clinch, she will usually look to close the distance again within moments. At UFC Fight Night 57, Kailin Curran struggled to establish range against VanZant. During their three-round bout, Felice Herrig was repeatedly held down by VanZant's grappling. The first fighter to defeat VanZant, Tecia Torres, largely avoided her clinch while attacking with strikes near the center of the cage. While fighting from a distance, she typically attacks with high kicks and punches. She credits her past experiences dancing with her ability to perform flexible and agile movements in her fights; she demonstrated this when she knocked out Bec Rawlings with a jumping switch kick which earned her a "Performance of the Night" bonus.

In addition to her striking, VanZant has a blue belt in Brazilian Jiu-Jitsu.

Professional wrestling career

All Elite Wrestling (2021–2022)
On September 15, 2021, VanZant made her first professional wrestling appearance, appearing for All Elite Wrestling (AEW) on their Dynamite program with fighters from American Top Team. The following week on Rampage: Grand Slam, VanZant attacked Chris Jericho. 

On the February 2, 2022 episode of Dynamite, American Top Team's Dan Lambert introduced VanZant to Brandi Rhodes, with VanZant later attacking Rhodes at his behest. The angle between VanZant and Rhodes was dropped after Brandi and her husband Cody announced that they were leaving AEW. On March 4, AEW founder Tony Khan tweeted that VanZant would sign with the promotion. VanZant appeared alongside her husband Austin Vanderford in the audience on the March 9 episode of Dynamite. During the main event, she attacked Tay Conti at ringside, distracting Sammy Guevara and assisting Scorpio Sky to win the TNT Championship. After the match, VanZant signed her AEW contract on top of Tay's body. On the May 27 episode of Rampage, it was announced that VanZant would make her in-ring debut at Double or Nothing, teaming with Ethan Page and Scorpio Sky to face Conti, Guevara, and Frankie Kazarian. At the event, VanZant's team was victorious. Zan Vant last appeared for AEW in April of 2022.

Media appearances

Dancing with the Stars
On March 8, 2016, VanZant was announced as one of the celebrities who would compete on season 22 of Dancing with the Stars. She partnered with professional dancer Mark Ballas. The couple reached the finals of the show and finished in second place behind model Nyle DiMarco and his partner Peta Murgatroyd.

1 For this week, VanZant performed with troupe member Alan Bersten due to Ballas suffering a back injury during rehearsals.2 Score given by guest judge Zendaya.3 For this week only, as part of "America's Switch Up", VanZant performed with Sasha Farber instead of Ballas. Ballas performed with Ginger Zee.4 Score given by guest judge Maksim Chmerkovskiy.5 Due to Inaba being the judge coaching VanZant's team during the team-up dance, the viewers scored the dance in her place with the average score being counted alongside the remaining judges.

Chopped
On March 3, 2017, VanZant was announced as one of 16 celebrities taking part in a celebrity cooking competition on the Food Network TV series Chopped. She was featured in the "Star Power: Culinary Muscle" episode, alongside former NFL player LaMarr Woodley, female Olympic gold medalist fencer Mariel Zagunis, and former Olympic gold medalist figure skater Dorothy Hamill. VanZant made it through the appetizer, and entree rounds to compete in the dessert round against Hamill. She then edged out Hamill in the dessert round to become the Chopped winner.

Writings
VanZant released her biography, Rise: Surviving the Fight of My Life on April 10, 2018. The book details her rise to fame, including her UFC battles, personal battles and appearances on Dancing with the Stars.

Personal life
Her father nicknamed her "12 Gauge" because of her love of shooting and hunting.

She has modeled for Nike and Columbia Sportswear.

In May 2018, VanZant confirmed that she had a breast augmentation, saying: "I'm a girl and always wanted my own boobs. They never came so I bought them."

In September 2018, VanZant married Austin Vanderford, a professional MMA fighter and a two-time NAIA All-American and national champion wrestler. The couple began dating the previous year, and Vanderford proposed to VanZant in January 2018.

Championships and accomplishments
 Ultimate Fighting Championship
 Fight of the Night (One time) vs. Kailin Curran
 Performance of the Night (One time) vs. Bec Rawlings
 MMAjunkie.com
 2019 January Submission of the Month vs. Rachael Ostovich

Mixed martial arts record

|-
|Loss
|align=center|8–5
|Amanda Ribas
|Submission (armbar)
|UFC 251 
|
|align=center|1
|align=center|2:21
|Abu Dhabi, United Arab Emirates
|
|-
|Win
|align=center|8–4
|Rachael Ostovich
|Submission (armbar)
|UFC Fight Night: Cejudo vs. Dillashaw
|
|align=center|2
|align=center|1:50
|Brooklyn, New York, United States
|
|-
|Loss
|align=center|7–4
|Jessica-Rose Clark
|Decision (unanimous)
|UFC Fight Night: Stephens vs. Choi
|
|align=center|3
|align=center|5:00
|St. Louis, Missouri, United States
|
|-
|Loss
|align=center|7–3
|Michelle Waterson
|Technical Submission (rear-naked choke)
|UFC on Fox: VanZant vs. Waterson
|
|align=center|1
|align=center|3:21
|Sacramento, California, United States
|
|-
|Win
|align=center|7–2
|Bec Rawlings
|KO (switch kick and punches)
|UFC on Fox: Maia vs. Condit
|
|align=center|2
|align=center|0:17
|Vancouver, British Columbia, Canada
|
|-
| Loss
|align=center|6–2
|Rose Namajunas
|Submission (rear-naked choke)
|UFC Fight Night: Namajunas vs. VanZant
|
|align=center|5
|align=center|2:25
|Las Vegas, Nevada, United States
|
|-
|Win
|align=center|6–1
|Alex Chambers
|Submission (armbar)
|UFC 191
|
|align=center|3
|align=center|1:01
|Las Vegas, Nevada, United States
|
|-
|Win
|align=center|5–1
|Felice Herrig
|Decision (unanimous)
|UFC on Fox: Machida vs. Rockhold
|
|align=center|3
|align=center|5:00
|Newark, New Jersey, United States
|
|-
|Win
|align=center| 4–1
|Kailin Curran
| TKO (punches)
|UFC Fight Night: Edgar vs. Swanson
|
|align=center| 3
|align=center| 2:54
|Austin, Texas, United States
|
|-
|Win
|align=center| 3–1
|Courtney Himes
| Technical Submission (rear-naked choke)
|BCP: Cage Warriors 15
|
|align=center| 1
|align=center| 2:21
|Grand Junction, Colorado, United States
|
|-
|Loss
|align=center| 2–1
|Tecia Torres
|Decision (unanimous)
|Invicta FC 4: Esparza vs. Hyatt
|
|align=center| 3
|align=center| 5:00
| Kansas City, Kansas, United States
|
|-
|Win
|align=center| 2–0
|Amber Stautzenberger
|Decision (unanimous)
|Premier Fight Series 2
|
|align=center| 3
|align=center| 5:00
|Fort Worth, Texas, United States
|
|-
|Win
|align=center| 1–0
|Jordan Nicole Gaza
|Decision (split)
|UWF: Tournament of The Warriors Finale
|
|align=center| 3
|align=center| 5:00
|Corpus Christi, Texas, United States
|
|-

Amateur record

|-
|Win
|align=center| 1–0
|Morgan Hunter
|Submission (rear-naked choke)
|URC 32 - Ultimate Reno Combat 32
|
|align=center| 1
|align=center| 0:50
|Reno, Nevada, United States
|

Bare knuckle boxing record

|-
|Loss
|align=center|0–2
|Rachael Ostovich
|Decision (unanimous)
|BKFC 19
|
|align=center|5
|align=center|2:00
|Tampa, Florida, United States
|
|-
|Loss
|align=center|0–1
|Britain Hart
|Decision (unanimous)
|BKFC Knucklemania
|
|align=center|5
|align=center|2:00
|Miami, Florida, United States
|

See also
 List of female mixed martial artists

References

External links

 
 
 

1994 births
21st-century professional wrestlers
Living people
All Elite Wrestling personnel
American female professional wrestlers
American female mixed martial artists
American female models
American practitioners of Brazilian jiu-jitsu
Bare-knuckle boxers 
Female Brazilian jiu-jitsu practitioners
Female models from Nevada
Female models from Oregon
Mixed martial artists from Nevada
Mixed martial artists from Oregon
Mixed martial artists utilizing Brazilian jiu-jitsu
OnlyFans creators
People from Dayton, Oregon
People from Dundee, Oregon
Sportspeople from Sparks, Nevada
Strawweight mixed martial artists
Ultimate Fighting Championship female fighters
United Service Organizations entertainers